Santo Rocco Gangemi (born 16 August 1961) is an Italian prelate of the Catholic Church who has spent his career in the diplomatic service of the Holy See.

Biography 
Gangemi was born in Messina on 15 August 1961. He was ordained a priest on 28 June 1986 by Archbishop Ignazio Cannavò of Messina.

On 27 January 2012, Pope Benedict XVI named him Titular Archbishop of Umbriatico and Apostolic Nuncio to the Solomon Islands. Cardinal Angelo Sodano consecrated him a bishop on 17 March.

His motto, Vide ut sileas ("See that you are quiet") comes from the book Isaiah . On 24 March 2012, he was also appointed Apostolic Nuncio to Papua New Guinea. He was replaced in those positions on 16 April 2013.

On 6 November 2013, Pope Francis appointed him Apostolic Nuncio to Guinea. On 5 February 2014, he was appointed Apostolic Nuncio to Mali as well.

He was appointed apostolic nuncio to El Salvador on 25 May 2018.

On 12 September 2022 Pope Francis appointed him Apostolic Nuncio to Serbia.

See also
 List of heads of the diplomatic missions of the Holy See

References

External links
Catholic Hierarchy: Archbishop Santo Rocco Gangemi 

Apostolic Nuncios to Guinea
Apostolic Nuncios to Mali
Apostolic Nuncios to the Solomon Islands
Apostolic Nuncios to Papua New Guinea
Apostolic Nuncios to El Salvador
1961 births
Religious leaders from Messina
Living people